Dnipro Kherson is an ice hockey team in Kherson, Ukraine. They play in Ukrainian Hockey League. Dnepr youth teams have repeatedly won national gold in their age divisions in 2012, 2014 and 2017. Also finishing second in 2013 and 2018.

Achievements
Black Sea Cup champion (3): 2009, 2011, 2012.

References

External links
Club profile on eurohockey.com

Ice hockey teams in Ukraine
Sport in Kherson